Jia Aur Jia is a 2017 Indian Hindi-language road film directed by Howard Rosemeyer. It stars Richa Chadda and Kalki Koechlin in lead roles. The movie is about how Jia teaches Jia how to live.

Cast
 Richa Chadda as Jia Venkatram
 Kalki Koechlin as Jia Grewal
 Arslan Goni as Vasu Krishna
 Badheka Harsh as Siddharth 
 Zarina Wahab as Jia Grewal's mother
 Sudhanshu Pandey as Arvind Jaisingh

Production
Jia Aur Jia is the directorial debut of Howard Rosmeyer. Principal photography for the film took place in Sweden.

Soundtrack

References

External links
 

2010s road comedy-drama films
2017 films
2010s Hindi-language films
Films shot in Sweden
Indian road comedy-drama films